The Musée Magnin is a national museum in the French city of Dijon in Burgundy, in the Côte-d'Or department, with a collection of around 2,000 works of art collected by Maurice Magnin and his sister Jeanne and bequeathed to the state in 1938 along with the hôtel Lantin, a 17th-century hôtel particulier in the old-town quarter of Dijon where it is now displayed as an amateur collector's cabinet of curiosities and as the Magnin family home.

Building 
Built between 1652 and 1681 for Etienne Lantin, councillor in the Accounts Chamber, the townhouse became the property of the Magnin family in the 19th century when Jean-Hugues Magnin (1791-1856) bought it in 1829. Without altering its historic flavor, the townhouse was redesigned in the 1930s by the Parisian architect Auguste Perret, to house the collection that Maurice Magnin, a year after the death of his sister Jeanne, willed to the State in 1938. This choice followed donations to the Musée Jacquemart-André in 1912 and the Musée Bonnat in 1922. In accordance with the donor's wishes, the museum has retained its characters as an amateur's cabinet and private dwelling, and can neither lend nor expand the collection.

Collection 
Maurice Magnin (1861–1939), referendum councilor in Accounts Court and art lover, and his sister Jeanne (1855-1937), painter and amateur art critic, randomly put together, through public auctions, a collection of major artists and little known minor masters. Brother and sister "looked less for the often illusionary spark of great names than for a chain of talent throughout the ages".

Gallery

Paintings
The collectors manifested a predilection for the French School from the 16th to the 19th centuries, especially well represented. Important 17th century works from Eustache Le Sueur, Laurent de La Hyre, Sébastien Bourdon and Jean Baptiste de Champaigne highlight this latter collection.

The museum visit begins with the galleries dedicated to the Northern Schools. Here one can admires, among many others works of Maerten de Vos, Roelant Savery, Jacobus Ferdinandus Saey, Bartholomeus van der Helst, Jan Baptist Huysmans, Jan Peeter Verdussen and Gerard de Lairesse.

Gallery
 

Italian art is equally well represented, especially by the Venetian Schools of the 16th century (among which Christ and the Adultress by Giovanni Cariani is one of the highlights) and the 18th century (Giovanni Battista Tiepolo, Giovanni Antonio Pellegrini...). There are also examples from both the Lombardian and Neapolitan Schools (Giovanni Stefano Danedi called Montalto, Giovanni Battista Cerano, Gaspare Traversi...).

Gallery

By choosing carefully, the Magnins accumulated an exceptional group of 17th French paintings. The two Putti Musicians by Laurent de La Hyre, The dream of Poliphile by Eustache Le Sueur and The Holy Family by Sébastien Bourdon all illustrate the Parisian Atticism of the years between 1640 and 1650.

Gallery

The 18th century has not been neglected, but is more represented by drawings and paintings of minor masters (Hyacinthe Collin de Vermont, Michel-François Dandré-Bardon, Jean-Baptiste Marie Pierre), than the grand painters like Jean-Antoine Watteau and Jean-Honoré Fragonard whose works acquired by the Magnins are no longer attributed to them.

The 19th century collection confirms the definitive and original taste of the collectors. Here one finds fewer beacons of Neo-classicism, Romanticism or Realism than paintings of François-Xavier Fabre, Pauline Gauffier or for the Post-revolutionary period the subtle and extremely rare landscapes of Anne-Louis Girodet de Roussy-Trioson. Their appreciation of the intimist works of the 1830s is obvious in their choice of artists such as François Marius Granet, Étienne Bouhot or for the Romantic period, Paul Delaroche, Alexandre-Évariste Fragonard or Eugène Devéria.

Gallery

The originality of this collection resides not only in the variety of artists represented but also in curiosity the Magnins had for the provincial schools. With Burgundian origins, Jeanne and Maurice involved themselves with art from their region as well as from Franche-Comté. Among some of the artists found at the museum, we can name Jean Bardin, Bénigne Gagneraux, Jean-François Gilles Colson and Jean-Claude Naigeon.

Works of art and graphic arts
The Magnin Museum is not only dedicated to paintings. It brings together a wonderful body of drawing from French and foreign schools, and offers the visitor an ensemble of furniture, works of art and sculptures: in short, a choice of seductive works. One can stop to admire the Secrétaire de dame à double pente (Lady's secretary with double slope) with the stamp of Bon Durand (Master in 1761) or in front of the sober Commode of Courte, a cabinet-maker from Dijon. There are also a few sculptures in the collection such as Auguste Préault's The Wave.

Bibliography
 Brejon de Lavergnée Arnauld, Catalogue des tableaux et des dessins italiens (XVe-XIX siècles), Inventaire des collections publiques françaises, Paris, 1980.
 Exposition catalog, Éloge de la clarté, un courant artistique au temps de Mazarin, Dijon, 1998.
 Exposition catalog, Visions du déluge, de la Renaissance au XIXe siècle, Paris, 2006.
 Exposition booklet, Charles Meynier 1763-1832, Paris, 2008
 Exposition album, Dessins français du XVIIe au XIXe siècle de la collection du musée Magnin, Dijon, 2008
 Exposition catalog, Boucher et les peintres du Nord, Paris, 2004.
 Termeulen Vincent, Les arts mobiliers du musée Magnin, Paris, 2008
 Les Peintures françaises, illustrated catalogue, preface by Emmanuel Starcky, with contributions from Hélène Isnard, Paris, Dijon, musée Magnin, 2000.

References

External links

National museums of France
Museums in Dijon
Art museums and galleries in France
Museums in Bourgogne-Franche-Comté
Museums in Côte-d'Or